Kalikaalam is a 1992 Indian Tamil-language drama film directed and written by Panchu Arunachalam. The film stars Raadhika and Nizhalgal Ravi. It is a remake of the Telugu film of same name. The film was released on 11 July 1992.

Plot

Raghuram, a daily wage worker, faces many challenges while earning for his family. He struggles hard to make money for the marriage of his children.

Cast 
 Raadhika as Janaki
 Nizhalgal Ravi as Raghuraman
 Janagaraj
 Shenbagam as Mary
 Shanmugham as Karthik
 Poorani
 Vivek as Krishnamoorthy's son
 Vennira Aadai Moorthy as Krishnamoorthy
 Delhi Ganesh
 Crazy Mohan
 Subbu Panchu as dancer in song "Kadhal Illamal"

Production 
Kalikaalam was directed by Panchu Arunachalam, who also wrote the screenplay and dialogue. The film was produced by Ar. Shanmuga Nathan and P. Ar. Subramaniam under Geetha Chitra Combines. Cinematography was handled by T. S. Vinayagam, and edited by N. Chandran. The film marked the acting debut of Shanmugham.

Soundtrack 
The soundtrack was composed by Ilaiyaraaja. Arunachalam also worked as lyricist.

Release and reception 
Kalikaalam was released on 11 July 1992. Ayyappa Prasad of The Indian Express said, "The screenplay and dialogue by Panchu Arunachalam as well as the story are good since the stress is on the materialistic younger generation but the film is marred by poor direction and technical flaws."

References

External links 
 

1990s Tamil-language films
1992 drama films
1992 films
Films directed by Panchu Arunachalam
Films scored by Ilaiyaraaja
Indian drama films
Tamil remakes of Telugu films